The 2016 Asia & Oceania Boxing Olympic Qualification Tournament for boxing at the 2016 Summer Olympics in Rio de Janeiro, Brazil, were held from March 25 to April 2, 2016 at the Tangshan Jiujiang Sport Center in Qian'an, China. 279 boxers entered the qualification tournament.

Medalists

Medal table

Men

Women

Qualification summary

Results

Men

Light flyweight (49 kg)
The top three boxers qualified to the 2016 Summer Olympics.

Flyweight (52 kg)
The top three boxers qualified to the 2016 Summer Olympics.

Bantamweight (56 kg)
The top three boxers qualified to the 2016 Summer Olympics.

Lightweight (60 kg)
The top three boxer qualified to the 2016 Summer Olympics.

Light welterweight (64 kg)
The top three boxers qualified to the 2016 Summer Olympics.

Welterweight (69 kg)
The top three boxers qualified to the 2016 Summer Olympics.

Middleweight (75 kg)
The top three boxers qualified to the 2016 Summer Olympics.

Light heavyweight (81 kg)
The top three boxers qualified to the 2016 Summer Olympics.

Heavyweight (91 kg)
The top three boxers qualified to the 2016 Summer Olympics.

Super heavyweight (+91 kg)
The top three boxers qualified to the 2016 Summer Olympics.

Women

Flyweight (51 kg)
The two finalists qualified to the 2016 Summer Olympics.

Lightweight (60 kg)
The two finalists qualified to the 2016 Summer Olympics.

Middleweight (75 kg)
The two finalists qualified to the 2016 Summer Olympics.

References

Boxing qualification for the 2016 Summer Olympics
2016 in Chinese sport
International boxing competitions hosted by China
2016 in boxing